Christopher David Dean (born 17 January 1988) is an English former professional rugby league footballer who played as a  forward or on the  in the 2000s and 2010s.

He played for St Helens in the Super League, and on loan from St. Helens at the Widnes Vikings in the Championship. Dean also played for the Wakefield Trinity Wildcats in the top flight, as well as Widnes in the top flight and the second tier.

Background
Dean was born in Higher End, Wigan, Greater Manchester, England.

Career
Dean signed for St Helens aged 15 from the Orrell St James club in the Orrell district of Wigan.

Dean made 23 first team appearances for St Helens scoring 10 tries. In December 2010, Wakefield Trinity Wildcats announced that Dean had joined the club on a one-year contract from Saints for the 2011 season in which he picked up 9 tries from 21 appearances.

In August 2011 it was reported that Dean would join Widnes for the 2012 season having previously had two loan spells at the club. Dean signed a three-year extension with Widnes in October 2014, followed in 2016 by a further extension until the 2018 season.

References

External links
Widnes Vikings profile
(archived by web.archive.org) St Helens profile
SL profile
Saints Heritage Society profile

1988 births
Living people
English rugby league players
Rugby league centres
Rugby league players from Wigan
Rugby league second-rows
St Helens R.F.C. players
Wakefield Trinity players
Widnes Vikings players